W3G Marine Ltd. is an engineering company based in Aberdeen, Scotland. The company was founded in 2010 with the intention of providing installation, management and engineering services to related industries. The company has set out the long-term goal of developing the patented OWTIS system, a new method of installing wind turbines which the company claims is more efficient.

OWTIS
OWTIS (Offshore Wind Turbine Installation Ship) is being developed by W3G Marine in collaboration with Dutch Engineering group IHC Merwede and could be built by the beginning of 2014. If OWTIS is built by 2014 then it would be ready before the UK's round Three offshore wind projects.

According to the ICH Merwede the OWTIS system would have significant advantages over current methods of offshore wind turbine installation. Benefits are said to include offshore safety improvements while installing turbines and also the requirement to do fewer tasks offshore. OWTIS is also said to have environmental benefits as it does not rely upon jacking feet and thus does not actually come into contact with the sea bed, preventing damage. The system would also be capable of operating in very harsh weather conditions and in addition deploying large loads in such conditions. In addition it would be capable of working on projects within the oil and natural gas sectors.

References

Companies based in Aberdeen
Manufacturing companies established in 2010
Engineering companies of Scotland
British companies established in 2010
2010 establishments in Scotland